Taiwanese push car railways or Taiwanese bamboo train were a historic transportation system on Taiwan, based on Japan's daisha push car railways. After Taiwan was ceded to Japan, the push car system was brought to Taiwan. The push car railways were in general service from 1895 to the late 1940s. The push cars complemented the developing steam locomotive system on Taiwan.

Push cars were passenger and freight cars powered by human labor. The push cars operated on narrow gauge railways. In Taiwan, the gauge was 45 to 50 cm. The design of the push cars was simple; the foundation of the push car was a platform attached to railway wheels. Behind the platform were two raised poles, where push car operators could push the car along the railways. Passenger push cars could seat up to four people, although most passenger cars could only seat two. Freight push cars could carry up to 450 pounds (204 kg).

The first push car line in Taiwan ran from Tainan to Kaohsiung; the line was completed in December 1895. The push car network ran across all of western, coastal Taiwan, running from Taipei to Kaohsiung. Push car lines were built across waterways and ran across inclined terrain.  The push car system reached its peak during the late 1920s to mid-1930s. The push cars were gradually replaced by modern road systems that often ran parallel to the old push car railways.

See also
Draisine
Hand car
Norry

References
 

Rail transport in Taiwan